James Fenner (January 22, 1771April 17, 1846) was an American politician who served as a United States Senator as well as the 7th, 11th and 17th Governor of Rhode Island (on three occasions). He was the son of Arthur Fenner, the fourth governor of Rhode Island.

Biography
Fenner was born in Providence in the Colony of Rhode Island and Providence Plantations. He graduated from Brown University in 1789, and was married to Sarah Whipple Jenckes (his first cousin, once removed) on November 17, 1792. He served as United States senator from 1805 to 1807, then gave up his senatorship to become Governor of Rhode Island, two years after his father died in office. Fenner served as governor from 1807 to 1811, from 1824 to 1831, and from 1843 to 1845. Fenner was elected to his first two terms as a Democratic-Republican and as his third term as a member of the Law and Order Party of Rhode Island. In his final term, Fenner became the first governor to serve under the Rhode Island Constitution, adopted in 1842.

Fenner died in his mansion "What Cheer" in 1846, and was interred in the North Burial Ground in Providence.

Fenner had four children with his wife, Sarah Jenckes:

Almira Theodosia (January 17, 1793 – October 10, 1872)
Sarah
Freelove (ca. 1799 – August 2, 1817)
Arthur (ca. 1810 – March 8, 1832)

External links

Gov. James Fenner in the Fenner Genealogy
 

Governors of Rhode Island
1771 births
1846 deaths
Brown University alumni
Politicians from Providence, Rhode Island
United States senators from Rhode Island
Rhode Island Democratic-Republicans
Law and Order Party of Rhode Island state governors of the United States
Democratic-Republican Party United States senators
Burials at North Burying Ground (Providence)
Democratic-Republican Party state governors of the United States